is a Japanese professional wrestler currently working for CyberFight. He appears on the Ganbare☆Pro-Wrestling (GanPro) brand under his real name, and on the DDT Pro-Wrestling brand as part of the Pheromones stable under the name .

Professional wrestling career

Ganbare Pro (2013–present) 
Imanari made his professional wrestling debut in DDT Pro-Wrestling in the Ganbare☆Pro-Wrestling (GanPro) branch of the company which hosted the No Cry, No Wrestle event from April 17, 2013, where he fell short to Osamu Namiguchi. At Can You Celebrate? on September 29, 2018, he unsuccessfully challenged Keisuke Ishii for the Independent World Junior Heavyweight Championship. Imanari often wrestled in unusual matches, such as a 13-on-1 handicap match which took place at  Momoiro Kneel Kick on April 14, 2019, where he teamed up with Cherry, Gota Ihashi, Minoru Fujita, Moeka Haruhi and others to defeat Ken Ohka.

On May 3, 2022, Imanari defeated Tatsuhito Takaiwa to win the Spirit of Ganbare World Openweight Championship.

DDT Pro-Wrestling (2013–present) 
Imanari seldom works for the bigger branch of the company. At Beer Garden Fight on August 2, 2018, Imanari competed in a 20-man falls count anywhere battle royal also involving Antonio Honda, Super Sasadango Machine, Danshoku Dieno, Yasu Urano, Yuki Ueno and others. At the 2020 edition of the Ganbare Climax, he scored the win by defeating Shinichiro Tominaga in the finals.

He is known for competing in various of the promotion's signature events such as DDT Peter Pan, making his first appearance at Ryōgoku Peter Pan 2018 on October 21 where he participated in a Rumble rules match won by Nobuhiro Shimatani and also involving Gorgeous Matsuno, Shota, Tiger Mask and others. Another notable event where he competed is DDT Ultimate Party, making his only appearance at Ultimate Party 2019 on November 3 where he teamed up with Ken Ohka and Miss Mongol to face Takumi Tsukamoto, Yasu Urano and Takato Nakano and Damnation (Tetsuya Endo, Mad Paulie and Nobuhiro Shimatani) in a Three-way match for the UWA World Trios Championship. At CyberFight Festival 2021, a cross-over event promoted by CyberFight on June 6 in which all DDT, Pro Wrestling Noah and Tokyo Joshi Pro Wrestling companies took part, Imanari teamed up with Shuichiro Katsumura and Kouki Iwasaki to defeat Ken Ohka, Keisuke Ishii and Shota in a six-man tag team match. In 2021, he formed the Pheremones stable with Danshoku "Dandy" Dieno & Yuki "Sexy" Iino.

Pro Wrestling Zero1 (2020–present) 
Imanari is also known for competing in Pro Wrestling Zero1. He won the 2020 edition of the Furinkazan Tournament by teaming up with Shinjiro Otani defeating Revengers (Takuya Sugawara and Masato Tanaka) in the first round, Voodoo Murders (Yoshikazu Yokoyama and Chris Vice) in the semi-finals and The Kubota Brothers (Yasu Kubota and Hide Kubota) in the final from December 25 which was also for the vacant NWA Intercontinental Tag Team Championship. At the 2021 edition of the event he teamed up with Yuna Manase and fell short to Hartley Jackson and Junya Matsunaga in the first round.

Championships and accomplishments
DDT Pro-Wrestling
GWC 6-Man Tag Team Championship (2 times) – with Ken Ohka and Miss Mongol
King of Dark Championship (1 time)
KO-D 6-Man Tag Team Championship (1 time, current) – with Danshoku "Dandy" Dino and Yuki "Sexy" Iino
I Will Not Give Up Tag Tournament (2017) – with Bambi
Ganbare☆Pro-Wrestling
Spirit of Ganbare World Openweight Championship (1 time)
Ganbare☆Climax (2018)
Japan Indie Awards
Best Unit Award (2021) – with Danshoku "Dandy" Dino and Yuki "Sexy" Iino
Pro Wrestling Zero1
NWA Intercontinental Tag Team Championship (1 time) – with Shinjiro Otani
Furinkazan (2020) – with Shinjiro Otani

References 

1985 births
Living people
Japanese male professional wrestlers
People from Niigata Prefecture
21st-century professional wrestlers
King of Dark Champions
KO-D 6-Man Tag Team Champions